The lieutenant governor of Hawaii is the assistant chief executive of the U.S. state of Hawaii and its various agencies and departments, as provided in the Article V, Sections 2 though 6 of the Constitution of Hawaii. Elected by popular suffrage of residents of the state on the same ticket as the governor of Hawaii, the officeholder is concurrently the secretary of State of Hawaii.

The officeholder becomes acting governor of Hawaii if the governor becomes disabled from duty. Historically, Hawaii lieutenant governors were members of either the Hawaii Democratic Party or Hawaii Republican Party. Four have gone on to become governor of Hawaii: George Ariyoshi, Ben Cayetano, John D. Waiheʻe III, and Josh Green.

Qualifications
The lieutenant governor of Hawaii is limited to two four-year terms.  Inauguration takes place on the first Monday in December following a gubernatorial election.  A single term ends at noon four years later.  The lieutenant governor must be thirty years old and be a resident of Hawaii for five consecutive years previous to election.  Unlike some other states, the office of Lieutenant Governor of Hawaii is a full-time position and requires that the lieutenant governor be barred from other professions or paid positions during the term.

List of lieutenant governors
Parties

References

External links

 Lieutenant Governor of the State of Hawaii - Official Site
 Constitution of the State of Hawaii – Article V - The Executive

Government of Hawaii
Hawaii